Parmouti 26 - Coptic Calendar - Parmouti 28

The twenty-seventh day of the Coptic month of Parmouti, the eighth month of the Coptic year. In common years, this day corresponds to April 22, of the Julian Calendar, and May 5, of the Gregorian Calendar. This day falls in the Coptic Season of Shemu, the season of the Harvest.

Commemorations

Martyrs 

 The martyrdom of Saint Victor son of Romanos

References 

Days of the Coptic calendar